Belmont Hosiery Mill was a historic textile mill building located at Belmont, Gaston County, North Carolina. The original section was built in 1945–1946, and was a two-story-on-basement brick mill building. In 1952, a two-bay-deep, two-story-on basement addition was built and in 1958, a two-story-on-basement rectangular addition was built and features Art Moderne detailing. In 1969, a roughly "U"-shaped two-story-on-basement addition was built at the rear of the mill. A small one-story loading dock addition completed around 1998. The mill closed in 2000.  The mill has been demolished.

It was listed on the National Register of Historic Places in 2002.

References

Textile mills in North Carolina
Industrial buildings and structures on the National Register of Historic Places in North Carolina
Moderne architecture in North Carolina
Industrial buildings completed in 1946
Buildings and structures in Gaston County, North Carolina
National Register of Historic Places in Gaston County, North Carolina